Wanted, a Boy is a 1924 British silent comedy film directed by Thomas Bentley and starring Sydney Fairbrother, Lionelle Howard and Pauline Johnson. It was made by British & Colonial Kinematograph Company at the company's Walthamstow Studios.

Cast
 Sydney Fairbrother as The Aunt
 Lionelle Howard as The Suitor
 Pauline Johnson as The Niece

Bibliography
 Low, Rachael. History of the British Film, 1918-1929. George Allen & Unwin, 1971.

External links

1924 films
1924 comedy films
British comedy films
1920s English-language films
Films directed by Thomas Bentley
British black-and-white films
British silent short films
1920s British films
Silent comedy films